Philodromus margaritatus is a species of philodromid crab spiders. It is found in Europe, Turkey, Caucasus, Russia to Kazakhstan, Korea and Japan.

References

External links 

 Philodromus margaritatus at the World Spider Catalog

margaritatus
Spiders described in 1757
Taxa named by Carl Alexander Clerck
Spiders of Europe
Spiders of Asia